The Warsaw Military District was one of three military districts in Poland, the other two being the Pomeranian Military District and the Silesian Military District. It was the regional executive body of the Ministry of National Defense of Poland in the capital of Warsaw in operational and defense matters and military administration existing from 1945 to 1998.

District history
After the end of World War II, six military districts were formed, and operating as of 1 August 1945, including the WOW. Months before in April, the Olsztyn was included in the district. In November 1945 the commander of the district was given the designation DOW I. In the autumn of 1945, the Faculty of the 2nd Division of Border Protection Forces (WOP) was formed at the Warsaw Military Command. The district, apart from administrative functions, also fulfilled the role of operational level command, subject to tactical relations and units stationed in its area. In 1949, the district was renamed the Warsaw Military District (WOW). In 1954, after the liquidation of the Krakow Military District, the WOW extended its reach to many regions such as Lublin, Kielce, Krakow and Rzeszów. After the establishment of the Soviet-led Warsaw Pact in 1955, the corps and part of the infantry division were disbanded. The remaining infantry divisions were transformed into mechanized divisions and were absorbed into the WOW. From the mid-1960s, in the event of a war on the basis of command and WOW units, the 4th Army was formed as part of the WOW. From April 1990, instead of the 4th General Army, based on the WOW, the 3 Mechanized Corps of the "W" time was created. At the end of 1998, as part of the reorganization of the military from military districts, the military district was disassembled and was primarily replaced through the Warsaw Garrison Command which was established three years prior.

Organization

1945
The command had the following organizational structure in 1945:

 1st Warsaw Infantry Division in Siedlce
 15 Infantry Division in Olsztyn
 1st Armoured Brigade of the defenders of Westerplatte in Modlin
 7th Independent Heavy Tank Regiment in Modlin
 13th Armored Artillery Regiment in Modlin
 5th Sappers Brigade
 1st Independent Communications Regiment

1951
The command had the following organizational structure in 1951:
 8th Infantry Corps in Olsztyn
 15 Infantry Division in Olsztyn
 21st Infantry Division in Lidzbark Warmiński
 22nd Infantry Division in Giżycko
 9th Infantry Corps in Lublin
 1st Warsaw Infantry Division in Legionowo
 3rd Pomeranian Infantry Division in Lublin
 18th Infantry Division in Ełk
 24th Infantry Division in Zambrów
 25th Infantry Division in Siedlce
 11th Middle Tanks Regiment in Giżycko
 8th Infantry Artillery Division in Orzysz
 9th Division of Artillery in Warsaw
 2nd Hard Sappers Brigade in Kazuń
 6th Hard Sappers Brigade in Dęblin
 7th Pontoon Regiment in Płock
 5th Communications Regiment

1988
The command had the following organizational structure in 1988:

 1st Mechanised Division in Legionowo
 3rd Pomeranian Mechanized Division in Lublin
 9rd Mechanized Division in Rzeszów
 5th Brigade of the Internal Defense Forces in Krakow
 6th Pomeranian Airborne Brigade in Krakow
 1st Artillery Brigade in Węgorzewo
 32nd Brigade of Operational-Tactic Missiles in Orzysz
 21st Field Technical Repair Database in Orneta
 80th Anti-tank Artillery Division in Suwałki
 2nd Sappers Brigade in Kazuń
 3rd Chemical Regiment in Biskupiec
 9th Communications Regiment in Białobrzegi
 Command post of the WOPL WOW Commander in Białobrzegi
 15 Anti-aircraft Regiment in Gołdap
 34th Radioactive Battalion in Modlin
 14th Reconnaissance Battalion School in Giżycko
 48th Special Company in Krakow

1997
The command had the following organizational structure in 1997:

 1st Mechanised Division in Legionowo
 15th Mechanised Division in Olsztyn
 16 Mechanized Division in Elbląg
 2nd Sappers Brigade in Kazuń
 1st Artillery Brigade in Węgorzewo
 2nd Territorial Defense Brigade in Mińsk Mazowiecki
 49th Combat Helicopters Regiment in Pruszcz Gdanski
 9th Command Regiment

Commanders

 Brigadier General Włodzimierz Nałęcz-Gembicki (1945)
 Divisional General Bruno Olbrycht (1945-1946)
 Divisional General Gustaw Paszkiewicz (1946-1948)
 Divisional General Wsiewolod Strażewski (1948-1949)
 Divisional General Jan Rotkiewicz (1949-1953)
 Brigadier General Franciszek Andrijewski (1953-1956)
 Divisional General Józef Kuropieska (1956-1964)
 Divisional General Czesław Waryszak (1964-1968)
 Divisional General Zygmunt Huszcza (1968-1972)
 Brigadier General Michał Stryga (1972)
 Divisional General Włodzimierz Oliwa (1972-1983)
 Divisional General Jerzy Skalski (1983-1987)
 Divisional General Jan Kuriata (1987-1989)
 Divisional General Zdzisław Stelmaszuk (1989-1990)
 Brigadier General Leon Komornicki (1990-1992)
 Divisional General Julian Lewiński (1992-1997)
 Divisional General Adam Rębacz (1997-1998)

See also
Operational structure of the Polish Land Forces
Warsaw Military District (Russian Empire)
Dowództwo Okręgu Korpusu

References

Michael Holm, Warsaw Military District, c2015

Military units and formations of Poland
Military units and formations established in 1945
1945 establishments in Poland
History of Warsaw
Military districts of Poland